Beyond the Pale is a weekly radio program broadcast on WBAI New York which "explores cutting edge Jewish culture and offers local, national, and international political debate and analysis from a Jewish perspective". It is sponsored by Jews for Racial & Economic Justice.

References

American talk radio programs
Anti-racism in the United States
Jewish anti-racism
Jewish socialism
Jews and Judaism in New York City
Opposition to antisemitism in the United States
Secular Jewish culture in the United States
American public radio programs